Sonidero Travesura is a Latin-synth duo from Tijuana, Mexico. The name roughly translates to "playful" or "mischievous sound system" and uses cumbia sonidera culture as an inspirational starting point.

Musical career 
The group, active since 2007 is an elemental member of "La Súper Cumbia Futuristica" collective, the two central members are synthesist Dardin Coria and drummer Omar Lizarraga, also known as forming members of Casa Wagner.
The Latin flavor of the self-claimed "Tigre Digital" style, now incorporates an assortment of instruments from organs and electric guitar to accordions and brass, usually rounding out their live shows with musical guests ranging from DJs like Dj Chucuchu to trumpet players like Sotelúm.

Discography 
Greatest Hits (2012) V.I.C.I.O
The Exotic Sounds of TJ (2014)

References

Mexican electronic musical groups
People from Tijuana
Musical groups from Tijuana
Mexican musical duos